ZLIB-FM is a variety hits radio station in Clarence Town, Bahamas.

External links 
 (via the Web Archive)

Radio stations in the Bahamas
Adult hits radio stations